The National Dairy Shrine is an American dairying group founded in 1949 and based in Wisconsin. The shrine promotes the dairy industry and records its history. As of 2007, the organization had over 18,000 members from most facets of dairying. It holds an annual ceremony where it inducts members of the dairy industry into its hall of fame.

Hoard Historical Museum

The National Dairy Shrine's museum is located in Fort Atkinson, Wisconsin. It shares a visitor center with the Hoard Historical Museum, which was William D. Hoard's house. Hoard, Wisconsin's 16th governor, was a prominent dairy advocate though his weekly publication, Hoard's Dairyman.

The National Dairy Shrine's museum contains exhibits about the history of dairying. Dairying objects in its collection include butter churns, milking machines, a treadle, and items used in the Babcock test for fat content of milk, which was developed nearby at the University of Wisconsin–Madison.

The Hoard Historical Museum focuses on local history.  Permanent exhibits include mounted bird dioramas, Native American artifacts, Sauk chief Black Hawk and the 1832 Black Hawk War, local poet Lorine Niedecker, quilts and antique clothing, and the mid-19th century period Foster House. One exhibit focuses on Abraham Lincoln and his activities in the area when he was a young man.

The museums are operated by the Fort Atkinson Historical Society.

Inductees

Pioneers

Aitken, David D.
Babcock, Stephen M.
Bakewell, Robert
Bang, Bernhard L. F.
Borden, Gail
De Laval, Karl Gustav
Eckles, Clarence H.
Stuart, Elbridge A.
Fraser, Wilber J.
Haecker, Theophilus L.
Hoard, William D.
Hunziker, Otto F.
Latzer, Louis
Mendel, Gregor J.
Morrill, Justin S.
Pasteur, Louis
Trout, G. Malcolm

See also
Merchants Avenue Historic District

References

External links
National Dairy Shrine
Hoard Historical Museum

Museums in Jefferson County, Wisconsin
Food museums in the United States
History museums in Wisconsin
Buildings and structures in Jefferson County, Wisconsin
American dairy organizations
Non-profit organizations based in Ohio
Industry museums in Wisconsin
Native American museums in Wisconsin
Biographical museums in Wisconsin